Martin Čater (born 20 December 1992) is a Slovenian World Cup alpine ski racer.

Career
He competed at the 2015 World Championships in Beaver Creek, USA, in the Super-G. On 13 December 2020 with a start number of 41, Čater gained his first World Cup victory, also his first podium, in a downhill at Val d'Isere, France.

World Cup statistics

Season standings

Top ten results
 1 win – (1 DH)
 1 podium – (1 DH); 6 top tens

World Championship results

Olympic results

References

External links

 

1992 births
Slovenian male alpine skiers
Living people
Sportspeople from Celje
Alpine skiers at the 2018 Winter Olympics
Olympic alpine skiers of Slovenia